Tulkan may refer to:
 Tulkan, Sistan and Baluchestan
 Tulkan, West Azerbaijan